Nikos Karelis (born 24 February 1992) is a Greek professional footballer who plays as a forward for Super League club Panetolikos.

Club career

Ergotelis
Born in Arkalochori, Heraklion, Karelis began playing football at the age of six, when his father, a retired footballer, signed him up at the infrastructure segments of Ergotelis. Karelis started training with the men's team at age 14 and signed his first professional contract with the club at the age of 15. He made his debut on 20 April 2008, on the final day of the 2007–2008 Greek Super League, entering as a second-half substitute (78 minute) in Ergotelis' 2–0 victory over Skoda Xanthi, thus becoming the youngest player to have ever been fielded for Ergotelis in a Super League match.

Karelis soon drew the attention of Premier League club Arsenal, and was invited to London to take part in a ten-day trial. He joined Arsenal's under 16s and travelled with them to Italy to take part in the Atalanta u16s Cup Tournament. Karelis scored two goals for the Gunners and made a strong impression, helping Arsenal win the cup, beating Juventus in the final on penalties. Having already signed a new contract with Ergotelis, a possible transfer move to the Premier League side was postponed, and eventually never completed.

In the 2008–09 season, Karelis was sidelined, making only two senior appearances adding up a total of 17 minutes of play. In August 2009 he was offered a new three-year contract. Karelis featured more in the 2009–10 season, making six appearances, predominantly as cover for veteran strikers Māris Verpakovskis and Sergio Leal. Karelis scored during a friendly game vs. Olympiacos, on 6 September 2009 commemorating Ergotelis' 80th anniversary, netting in the fifth to complete his club's win over the reigning champions in a memorable 5–0 victory.

Karelis had his best season for Ergotelis in the 2010–11 Superleague, playing a total of 13 times, two of which as a starter. He also scored his first Super League goal in the final fixture, converting a penalty kick in a 4–0 away win vs. Panserraikos. He added another 9 appearances in the 2011–12 season, in which the club was eventually relegated to the Football League. Following Ergotels's relegation, Karelis decided to move on and despite reported interest from other Super League clubs, signed with Russian Premier League side Amkar Perm.

Amkar Perm
In July 2012 he signed with Russian Premier League side Amkar Perm. Karelis appeared predominantly as a substitute.

Panathinaikos
On 30 July 2013, Karelis signed for Panathinaikos a three-year contract, with Amkar Perm retaining a 20% sell-on-clause. He made his Panathinaikos debut on 18 August 2013 in a 2–0 home win against Panetolikos. He scored his first two goals for the club on the 24 Novemeer 2013 in a 3–1 home win against PAS Giannena. On 26 April 2014, he scored the third goal to help secure the first trophy of his career in a 4–1 win against PAOK in the Greek Cup final. On 15 February 2015, in a match with OFI Crete, he scored two goals, helping Panathinaikos to a 3–2 away win. Following Nano, Abdul Jeleel Ajagun and Thanasis Dinas, Nikos Karelis signed a contract on increased terms with Panathinaikos until the summer of 2018.

In May 2019, after scoring 16 goals, prior to Superleague playoffs (13 in the Superleague, 2 in Europa League and 1 in the Greek Cup), Karelis was linked with moves to Torino and Werder Bremen. On 31 May 2015, Panathinaikos reportedly turned down a Lille bid for Karelis. In summer 2015, Anderlecht and Getafe CF were linked with possibles moves during the summer transfer window.

On 28 July 2015, a penalty from Karelis clinched a 2–1 win for Panathinaikos against Club Brugge, in the first leg of the UEFA Champions League of the third qualifying round. He started the 2015–16 season by scoring in a 2–1 away win against Panetolikos.
On 28 October 2015, despite Karelis lower productivity in the season, is still attracting Genk's interest, for the upcoming transfer window. Genk tried to lure the Greek striker away from Panathinaikos over the summer but the Greens rejected two bids for his services. He left the club as the first scorer of the first half of the 2015–16 season with 9 goals and 5 assists.

Genk
On 12 January 2016, Karelis signed a 3.5 year-contract with Genk, with Panathinaikos keeping a 16% next transfer percentage. He made his debut for the club on 15 January 2016 at home to Waregem, coming on as a 77th-minute substitute for Alejandro Pozuelo and then scoring the winning goal in the 88th minute to give Genk's 10 men a 2–1 victory. On 3 February 2016, he scored in the 1–1 draw against Standard Liège but the result was not enough to see them through to the next round of the Belgian Cup. On 13 February 2016, Karelis scored a brace one with a kick in a 6–1 win against Waasland-Beveren. On 28 February 2016, he opened the score with a penalty kick in a 3–2 home win against Club Brugge. On 5 March 2016, he opened the score after an assist from Alejandro Pozuelo in a 2–1 away loss against Standard Liège. On 1 May 2016, he scored the only goal as a substitute, in a 3–1 away loss against Club Brugge. On the last home game for the season, he scored the last goal as a substitute in a 5–2 victory against rivals Anderlecht for the playoffs. On 29 May 2015, in the last game of Play-offs Finals against Charleroi he scored a hat-trick, his first in the season, helping his club to win the exit to next Europa League' season, arrived at 10 goals in his first season in Belgian Pro League.

In his first match for the 2016–17 season Karelis opened the score after an in a 2–1 home win against Oostende. On 21 September 2016, he scored four times in his team's 4–0 away victory against Aalst for the Belgian Cup. On 29 September 2016, he scored his first international goal for the season when he opened the score in a 3–1 home Europa League Group stage match against Italian club Sassuolo. On 2 October 2016, he equalised with a penalty kick the score in a 2–1 home win against KV Mechelen. On 15 October 2016, he netted both goals against Mouscron, helping his club to escape with a valuable 2–2 away draw. On 23 October 2016, he netted the only goal helping his club to acquire a valuable win against Sint-Truidense for the Belgian Pro League. On 26 October 2016, a lackluster start by the home side Charleroi was punished after four minutes as Genk's Mbwana Samatta headed a corner towards the far post and there Karelis surprised everyone with his seventh goal of the season, opening the score in a 2–1 away loss. On 29 October 2016, he scored his second goal in a Pro League 2–1 home game against Westerlo, extended his run of scoring to a record of 5 matches, became the League top goalscorer so far. On 24 November 2016, in a UEFA Europa League group stage home match against Rapid Wien he fired in Genk's early winner from close range after Leon Bailey's header hits the bar, being the MVP of the match.
On 14 December 2016, he scored three goals in an overtime win against Charleroi helping Genk advance to the semifinals of the Belgian Cup. On 27 December 2016, he scored with a penalty kick in a 2–0 home win against Gent, but at the very beginning of the second half faced a cruciate ligament rupture that probably kept him out of the team for at least 8 months. Karelis was injured early in the second half on a play that did not involve a foul or even a challenge. Karelis was simply dribbling the ball as fell hard on his left knee, causing the ACL rupture.

On 19 October 2017, Karelis returned to the pitch after a difficult recovery process (290 days to be exact) from his ruptured ACL injury. The Greek striker played 45 minutes with Genk's second team in a friendly match against Lokeren, and a week later he made his debut with the first team as a substitute in a 0–0 away game against Kortrijk. On 17 December 2017, in his 7th appearance in the squad, after his injury, scored with the head helping his club to acquire a vital 1–1 away draw against rivals Charleroi. On 9 February 2018, since returning from a serious injury earlier in the season, the 25-year old has struggled for goals, not always in the Genk starting line-up. Nevertheless, Karelis managed to score his second goal in the 2017–18 season in a 3–1 win against Zulte Waregem. Seventeen minutes after the match began, a poor error allowed Karelis to go clean through with the goalkeeper. His first effort was saved, but he picked up the rebound to steer the ball into the unguarded net. Karelis then registered an assist for Genk's second goal, later leaving the pitch with five minutes remaining. On 17 February 2018, Karelis scored his third of the season for Genk, helping his team claim an entertaining 2–2 draw against Club Brugge in the Jupiler League.  In the 11th minute Karelis escaped the attentions of the Brugge defence, calmly slotting beyond opposing goalkeeper Kenneth Vermeer into the far left corner. However, there was a sting in the tail, as Karelis failed to convert a penalty in the second half. On 23 February 2018, he scored for third consecutive game after an assist from Joakim Mæhle in a 4–0 home win game against Antwerp.

Loan to PAOK
In the summer of 2018, PAOK showed an interest in the Greek international, but the transfer fee of €5 million was prohibitive for the club. Karelis joined PAOK at the transfer deadline day on a loan deal.
On 15 September he made his debut with the club as a starter in a 3–1 away win game against OFI. On 20 December 2018, he scored a brace in a comfortable 6–0 away win against Aittitos Spata for the Greek Cup.

Brentford
On 22 August 2019, free agent Karelis signed for English Championship side, Brentford, initially on a 1-year deal with an option for another year. In October 2019 he suffered a 'serious' knee injury. He was released at the end of the season after a difficult recovery process (194 days to be exact) from his ruptured ACL injury.

ADO Den Haag
On 8 October 2020, ADO Den Haag has strengthened itself with the signing of the Greek international Nikos Karelis as a free transfer. The 28-year-old striker signed a one-year contract, with an option for another season. He has been without a club since his contract with Premier League club Brentford was not renewed last summer.

Panetolikos
On 30 January 2021, Karelis returned to the Superleague Greece, signing a contract with Panetolikos, until the summer of 2022, on a free transfer. On 17 October 2021, he scored his first goal with the club with a header, opening the score in a frustrating 2–1 home loss against rivals OFI. It was his first goal after almost 26 months. On 18 December 2021, he scored as a substitute, the winning goal against Atromitos helping his club to acquire a vital 2–1 home win game, in its effort to avoid relegation. On 16 January 2022, along with his teammate Javier Mendoza are the main protagonists with one goal and one assist each, in a triumphatic 2–1 away win against AEK Athens and a week later he scored again after Javier Mendoza's assist in a new away 4–2 win against OFI.  On 19 January 2022, between the two games for the championship, along with the usual protagonist of the last games,Javier Mendoza, he scored again against champions Olympiakos taking a 2–1 lead for the final qualification in the next round of the Greek Cup. On 6 March 2022, he opened the score in vital 2-1 Super League I away win against Ionikos. 

On 1 July 2022, Karelis signed two-year contract renewal.

International career
Karelis has represented Greece in the national youth teams: Greece U17, 2009–2010; Greece U19, 2008–2011; and Greece U21, 2010–2014.

In his full international debut with the Greece national football team he scored against Finland in Helsinki during the UEFA Euro 2016 qualifying. In that 1–1 away draw, the risk that Greece coach Claudio Ranieri took by introducing a previously unseen forward lineup (Charalampos Mavrias, Nikos Karelis and Stefanos Athanasiadis) seemed to pay off in the first half, but the lack of experience shown in the second as Greece could not hold onto their lead and risked losing all three points, besides the fact that with 24 minutes on the clock the ball fell to Karelis who unleashed a swerving shot from the left that swung its way to the left corner of the Finnish goal for 1–0.

Career statistics

Club

International

International goals
Scores and results list Greece's goal tally first.

Honours
Panathinaikos
 Greek Cup: 2013–14

PAOK
Super League Greece: 2018–19
Greek Cup: 2018–19
Individual
Super League Greece Team of the Year: 2014–15

References

External links

 
 
 
 

1992 births
Living people
Footballers from Heraklion
Greek footballers
Greece youth international footballers
Greece under-21 international footballers
Greece international footballers
Super League Greece players
Russian Premier League players
Belgian Pro League players
Eredivisie players
Ergotelis F.C. players
FC Amkar Perm players
Panathinaikos F.C. players
K.R.C. Genk players
PAOK FC players
ADO Den Haag players
Panetolikos F.C. players
Greek expatriate footballers
Expatriate footballers in Russia
Expatriate footballers in Belgium
Expatriate footballers in the Netherlands
Greek expatriate sportspeople in the Netherlands
Association football forwards
Brentford F.C. players
English Football League players
Expatriate footballers in England